Mi Mejor Regalo may refer to:
Mi Mejor Regalo (Yolandita Monge album), 1992
Mi Mejor Regalo (Charlie Zaa album), 2015